Võnnu Parish was a rural municipality in Tartu County, Estonia.

Settlements
Small borough
Võnnu
Villages
Agali - Ahunapalu - Hammaste - Imste - Issaku - Kannu - Kõnnu - Kurista - Lääniste - Liispõllu - Rookse - Terikeste

Twin towns
 Kyyjärvi,  Finland

Gallery

References

External links

Municipalities of Estonia
Populated places in Tartu County